Süloğlu (Greek: Ασβεστοχώρι Asvestochṓri) is a district of Edirne Province of Turkey. The population was 3,394 in 2010. The mayor is Mehmet Ormankıran (CHP).

History
After the Turkish War of Independence, Süloğlu became a part of Turkey in 1922. The town was a part of the Edirne district. In 1991 it became its own district.

Geography
Süloğlu borders the district of Lalapaşa at the north, the province of Kırklareli at the east, the district of Havsa at the south and the district of Edirne at the west. The town is located 33 kilometers from the city of Edirne and 232 kilometers from Istanbul.

Name
Edirne (1922-1991) 
Süloğlu (1991-present) 
The area was a part of the Edirne district before 1991, when it became its own district.

References

Populated places in Edirne Province
Districts of Edirne Province